The 2006 congressional elections in Minnesota were held on November 7, 2006 to determine who would represent the state of Minnesota in the United States House of Representatives.

Minnesota had eight seats in the House, apportioned according to the 2000 United States Census.  Representatives are elected for two-year terms; those elected served in the 110th Congress from January 3, 2007 until January 3, 2009.  The election coincided with the Senate election and the gubernatorial election.

Overview

District 1

In his bid for a seventh term in Congress, incumbent Republican Congressman Gil Gutknecht faced off against Tim Walz, a high school teacher and the DFL nominee in this swing district based in southern Minnesota. Walz upset Gutknecht by a margin of 5.6%.

Democratic primary

Candidates
 Tim Walz, high school teacher and retired military officer

Results

Republican primary

Candidates
 Gil Gutknecht, incumbent U.S. Representative since 1995
 Gregory Mikkelson

Results

General election

Results

District 2

Incumbent Republican Congressman John Kline ran for a third term in this conservative district based in the southern suburbs of the Twin Cities. Kline was opposed in the general election by Coleen Rowley, the DFL nominee and a former FBI agent, whom he defeated by a comfortable margin.

General election

Results

District 3

Incumbent Republican Congressman Jim Ramstad ran for what would be his ninth and final term in the United States Congress from this conservative district that encompassed the northern, western, and southern suburbs of Minneapolis and St. Paul in Hennepin County and Anoka County. Ramstad was opposed in his bid for reelection by the DFL nominee, local radio host Wendy Wilde, and he won overwhelmingly.

Democratic primary

Candidates
 Kevin Ray Smith
 Gavin Sullivan
 Wendy Wilde, local radio host

Results

Republican primary

Candidates
 Jim Ramstad, incumbent U.S. Representative since 1991

Results

General election

Results

District 4

In this staunchly liberal district comprising St. Paul and some northern suburbs, incumbent DFL Representative Betty McCollum ran for a fourth term, opposed by Republican Obi Sium, an employee of the Minnesota Department of Natural Resources. McCollum was in no danger of losing her seat, and won reelection with nearly 70% of the vote.

Democratic primary

Candidates
 Betty McCollum, incumbent U.S. Representative since 2001

Results

Republican primary

Candidates
 Jack Shepard, fugitive, alleged arsonist, and former Minneapolis dentist who fled the country after allegedly attempting to burn down his own dental office
 Obi Sium, Minnesota Department of Natural Resources employee

Results

General election

Results

District 5

Rather than seek a 15th term in Congress, incumbent DFL Congressman Martin Olav Sabo decided to retire, creating an open seat. State Representative Keith Ellison beat out Mike Erlandson, Slabo's chief of staff; Ember Reichgott Junge, a former state senator; and Paul Ostrow, a Minneapolis City Councilman in the DFL primary. In the general election, Ellison faced off against businessman Alan Fine, the Republican nominee, and Tammy Lee, the Independence Party nominee, who had served as press secretary for United States Senator Byron Dorgan of North Dakota and communications director for Skip Humphrey's 1998 gubernatorial campaign. The district, based in Minneapolis and some suburbs located in Anoka County and Ramsey County, strongly supported DFL candidates, so Ellison was highly favored in the general election. Indeed, despite a surprisingly strong performance by Lee, Ellison emerged victorious, and became the first African-American Congressman from Minnesota and the first Muslim in Congress.

Democratic primary

Candidates
 Keith Ellison, State Representative from district 58B since 2003
 Mike Erlandson, chief of staff of the office of Congressman Martin Olav Sabo
 Andrew Vincent Favorite
 Gregg A. Iverson
 Paul Ostrow, Minneapolis City Councilor
 Ember Reichgott Junge, former State Senator from district 46 (1983-2001)
 Patrick J. Wiles

Results

Independence Party primary

Candidates
 Tammy Lee, former press secretary to U.S. Senator Byron Dorgan, and former communications director of Skip Humphrey's 1998 gubernatorial campaign

Results

Republican primary

Candidates
 Alan Fine, businessman

Results

General election

Results

District 6

Incumbent Republican Congressman Mark Kennedy declined to seek a fourth term in Congress, instead opting to run for Senate in the wake of then-Senator Mark Dayton's retirement. To replace him in this conservative-leaning district that encompassed the northern suburbs of the Twin Cities, including St. Cloud, State Senator Michele Bachmann clinched the Republican nomination, while Patty Wetterling, a national advocate of children's safety and Kennedy's 2004 opponent, emerged as the DFL nominee once again. They were joined by Minnesota Independence Party candidate John Paul Binkowski. During the campaign, Wetterling attacked Bachmann for voting against increased restrictions on sex offenders, while Bachmann accused Wetterling of wanting to negotiate with terrorists, charges each denied. Despite polling that indicated that the race would be close, and although this was the most expensive House race in Minnesota, Bachmann defeated Wetterling by a large margin, with Binkowski receiving about 8%.

General election

Results

District 7

This conservative, rural district based in western Minnesota had been represented by DFL Congressman Collin Peterson since 1991, and this year, Peterson sought a ninth term in Congress. Despite the district's tendency to vote for Republicans at the national level, Peterson had been able to hold on to his seat with ease, and this year proved no different. Opposed by pharmacist Michael J. Barrett, the Republican nominee, and a few independent politicians, Peterson overwhelmingly won reelection with close to 70% of the vote.

Democratic primary

Candidates
 Collin C. Peterson, incumbent U.S. Representative since 1991
 Erik Thompson

Results

Republican primary

Candidates
 Michael J. Barrett, pharmacist

Results

General election

Results

District 8

This liberal-leaning district, based in the Arrowhead Region of Minnesota, had been represented since 1975 by DFL Congressman Jim Oberstar, the state's longest-serving Congressman. This year, he sought a 17th term and faced former United States Senator Rod Grams, who lived outside the district and had represented the 6th district in Congress twelve years earlier. Despite Grams's high stature and name recognition, he posed no serious threat to Oberstar, who was reelected in a landslide.

References

2006
Minnesota
2006 Minnesota elections